Willie Hill (born Unknown) is a retired Canadian football wide receiver in the Canadian Football League (CFL). In college, he played for the Central Michigan University Chippewas. As a professional, he played for Arizona Cardinals and B.C. Lions. He is now a football coach.

Early years 
He attended Stranahan High School in Fort Lauderdale, Florida, where he played football under Vince Schaivo and ran track under Doug McFadden  for the Stranahan Dragons. Willie held track and field record in the 200 with a 21.1 (ran at St. Thomas HS in 1999) and a 21.5 (ran at Dillard-All Broward County Track Meet in 1999). Hill received a full athletic scholarship to Central Michigan University in 1999.

College career 
Hill attended Central Michigan University in Mt. Pleasant, Michigan. While attending CMU, Hill played for two head coaches Dick Flynn and Mike DeBord (2003 Central Michigan Chippewa football team).  He appeared in thirty-five games in his career as a Chippewa, and started in twenty-three.  He totaled: twenty tackles, two interceptions, and nine passes defensed as a defensive back for Willie Martinez - University of Tennessee, 47 receptions, 872 yards, 16 touchdowns, 2 punt return touchdowns, and 3 kick return touchdowns as a receiver for then offensive coordinator Butch Jones - University of Tennessee. Hill also held the school record in the 60 meter dash with a time of 6.72 as a sophomore and rumored to only have run in 2 track meets in his career at Central Michigan.

Professional career 
Before the 2005 NFL Draft, Hill was not invited to participate at the NFL Scouting Combine.  At the Michigan State University Pro Day, Hill posted a 40-yard dash time of 4.31, 3.98 pro shuttle, 6.87 3-cone, and a 42.5-inch vertical leap, which rated among the top five performances at the 2005 combine.

The Arizona Cardinals selected Hill as an undrafted free agent in April 2005 and he subsequently participated for the Cardinals practice team in August 2005.  After competing for a roster spot among a group of talented, young wide receivers in the Cardinals training camp, Hill suffered an injury that sidelined him for the rest of training camp. He was then released on October 9, 2005. In November 2005 Hill was signed to the B.C. Lions of the CFL. After being hit with several injuries, Hill decided to retire.

Arizona Cardinals 
Hill was picked up as an undrafted free agent in 2005 by the Arizona Cardinals of the NFL

Coaching career 
In 2009 Hill began his coaching career as a high school assistant football and basketball coach in the small rural city of Clewiston, located in the “Muck” area of Florida where at least 75% of the nation's sugar is manufactured.  From there Hill was hired as the Offensive Coordinator at neighboring Moore Haven High School by Maurice Belser.  Assisting with the play calling and installation of a spread-attack offense, that produced a school and area high of 66 points vs. St. Stephens.  Also produced a 2,400 yard rusher, and Division 1B player of the year Terry Hallback in 2010.

In 2011 Hill was hired as the Recruiting Coordinator and Wide Receiver's Coach for the Stillman Tigers. Under the supervision of Head Coach Teddy Keaton Hill was recognized for his recruitment of 23 Florida student athletes, and assisted with the installation of the air raid offense that sprung the Tigers from the bottom of the Southern Intercollegiate Athletic Conference (SIAC) into the top three in just one season. Which was Stillman College's first winning season (7-4) in 7 seasons. In 2013 Hill was hired as the Head Football Coach at his alma mater Stranahan High School. Hill posted a 4-6 record. Hill was tagged Most Active Social Media High School Football Coach in the country by www.twitter.com. Hill and Stranahan parted ways in the Spring of 2014 due to uncertain conflicts with administration.  Hill went back to Stillman and served as Director of High School Relations was ultimately responsible for Stillman having  #1 recruiting class for 2015 in the country. Coach Hill again was recognized for his recruitment of South Florida with Stillman landing 32 South Florida verbal commitments for the class of 2015. Rumor has it that Hill is responsible in just four years of coaching for over 52 student-athletes signing scholarships. Hill now serves as an Offensive Assistant Coach at Cardinal Gibbons HS in Fort Lauderdale FL.

References 

Year of birth missing (living people)
Living people
Central Michigan Chippewas football players
BC Lions players
Players of Canadian football from Fort Lauderdale, Florida